Rajathi, better known by her stage name Indraja, is an Indian actress known for her work in Telugu and Malayalam films. She has also appeared in a few Tamil and Kannada films, in addition to television shows.

Early life
Indraja was born as Rajathi in a Telugu Brahmin family in Chennai. She is the eldest of three sisters and comes from a Carnatic music family. During school days, she won prizes in singing and drama competitions. A trained classical singer and dancer, she learned Kuchipudi dance form Madhavapeddi Murthy. She was preparing to be a journalist.

Career
Indraja was cast as a child actress in Rajinikanth-starrer Uzhaippali movie. With Jantar Mantar, her first movie as a grown-up, she adopted the name of her character in that movie, 'Indraja' as her stage name. Later, S. V. Krishna Reddy's Yamaleela catapulted her to instant stardom. The film ran for over a year. She acted in Thadayam and Rajavin Parvaiyile but she was not able to make much headway in Tamil movies, as both movies failed to make an impact at the box office.

She played the female lead roles in a number of successful Malayalam films, such as the 1999 action drama Ustaad alongside Mohanlal, crime thriller F.I.R alongside Suresh Gopi, 2002 comedy-drama Chronic Bachelor alongside Mammootty, 2004 comedy drama Mayilattam opposite Jayaram, and 2005 action drama Ben Johnson alongside Kalabhavan Mani are some of her most notable Malayalam films. After a hiatus post her marriage, she has returned to movies with some notable roles in several Telugu movies.

Personal life
Indraja is married to actor and businessman Mohammed Absar. The couple has a daughter named Sara.

Filmography

Films

Television

References

External links
 

Living people
20th-century Indian actresses
Actresses in Telugu cinema
Actresses in Malayalam cinema
Telugu actresses
Actresses in Tamil cinema
Indian film actresses
Actresses in Kannada cinema
21st-century Indian actresses
Indian television actresses
Actresses in Telugu television
Actresses in Tamil television
Actresses from Chennai
Year of birth missing (living people)